Thomas Brosnahan (17 May 1892 – 22 July 1977) was a New Zealand cricketer. He played in eight first-class matches for Canterbury from 1919 to 1929.

See also
 List of Canterbury representative cricketers

References

External links
 

1892 births
1977 deaths
New Zealand cricketers
Canterbury cricketers
People from Temuka
Cricketers from Canterbury, New Zealand